Whitecrow Lake is located in Glacier National Park, in the U. S. state of Montana. Whitecrow Lake is south of Whitecrow Mountain and east of Stoney Indian Peaks.

See also
List of lakes in Glacier County, Montana

References

Lakes of Glacier National Park (U.S.)
Lakes of Glacier County, Montana